Laurence de Montmorency (1571–1654) was a French court official.  She served as Première dame d'honneur to the queen of France, Anne of Austria, from 1615 until 1624.  Until 1618, she shared her office with Inés de la Torre.

Life
Laurence de Montmorency was the daughter of Claude de Clermont-Montoison, and married in 1601 to duke and Constable Henri I de Montmorency in his third marriage. She was widowed in 1614.

In 1615, she was appointed Première dame d'honneur to the new queen of France, Anne of Austria, upon her arrival in France. However, when Anne arrived at the French royal court in Paris, a dilemma occurred, as she was given a new household composed of Frenchmen upon her arrival, but did not wish to dismiss her Spanish retinue.     A compromise was met where she was allowed to keep both households.    This resulted in a situation where several offices at her court was split, and the post of Première dame d'honneur  was consequently shared by Laurence de Montmorency and her Spanish counterpart Inés de la Torre, just as the second rank office of Dame d'atour was shared between the Spanish Luisa de Osorio and her French counterpart Antoinette de Vernet.   

In 1618, Anne's Spanish courtiers were sent home and Laurence de Montmorency became her only Première dame d'honneur. In 1619, however, the new office of Surintendante de la Maison de la Reine was introduced with the appointment of Marie de Rohan, outranking her. She wished to resign, but stayed to nurse the queen, who fell sick when the whole hing happened; when Marie de Rohan was banished in 1622, she again became the highest ranked lady-in-waiting at court, a position she is said to have performed with diplomatic charm.

References 

1654 deaths
17th-century French people
French ladies-in-waiting
1571 births
Court of Louis XIII
Household of Anne of Austria